Operation Cyberstorm was a two-year undercover operation in the United States by the Federal Bureau of Investigation (FBI), against illegal copying of software.  At the time, it was the largest sweep ever conducted by the FBI against illegal copying.

Investigations
A number of individuals purchased software at discounts, and resold them at a profit  in violation of their software license.

Convictions
Mirza Ali, 60, of Fremont, California and Sameena Ali, 53, also of Fremont, were sentenced in 2007 to 60 months imprisonment, and forfeiture in the amount of $5,105,977. Keith Griffen, 56, of Oregon City, Oregon, was sentenced to 33 months of imprisonment, restitution to Microsoft Corporation in the amount of $20,000,000, three years of supervised release, and $900 in special assessments. William Glushenko, 66, was sentenced to one year of probation and 100 hours of community service after pleading guilty to misprision of felony.

References

Federal Bureau of Investigation operations
Copyright enforcement
Law enforcement operations in the United States